Radio 101 may refer to:

 Radio 101 (Croatia)
 Radio 101 (Latvia)
 Radio 101 (Malta)
 Radio 101 (Italy), owned by the Arnoldo Mondadori Editore group
 Radio 101 (United Kingdom)
 "Radio 101" (song), a song by Beverley Mahood